The 1967 NBA draft was the 21st annual draft of the National Basketball Association (NBA). The draft was held on May 3 and 4, 1967 before the 1967–68 season. In this draft, 12 NBA teams took turns selecting amateur U.S. college basketball players. A player who had finished his four-year college eligibility was eligible for selection. If a player left college early, he would not be eligible for selection until his college class graduated. The first two picks in the draft belonged to the teams that finished last in each division, with the order determined by a coin flip. The Detroit Pistons won the coin flip and were awarded the first overall pick, while the Baltimore Bullets were awarded the second pick. The remaining first-round picks and the subsequent rounds were assigned to teams in reverse order of their win–loss record in the previous season. Five teams that had the best records in previous season were not awarded second round draft picks. Two expansion franchises, the Seattle SuperSonics and the  San Diego Rockets, took part in the NBA Draft for the first time and were assigned the sixth and seventh pick in the first round, along with the last two picks of each subsequent round. The draft consisted of 20 rounds comprising 162 players selected.

Draft selections and draftee career notes
Jimmy Walker from Providence College was selected first overall by the Detroit Pistons. Earl Monroe from Winston-Salem State University, who went on to win the Rookie of the Year Award in his first season, was drafted second by the Baltimore Bullets. Monroe, fifth pick Walt Frazier and ninth pick Mel Daniels have been inducted to the Basketball Hall of Fame. They were also named in the 50 Greatest Players in NBA History list announced at the league's 50th anniversary in 1996. Monroe and Frazier both won the NBA championship with the Knicks in 1973. Three seasons earlier in 1970, Frazier was also a member of the Knicks team that won the NBA championship for the first time. Frazier was selected to seven All-NBA Teams, six All-Star Games and seven All-Defensive Teams, while Monroe was selected to one All-NBA Team and four All-Star Games. Walker and 19th pick Bob Rule are the only other players from this draft who have been selected to an All-Star Game. Daniels, the 9th pick, opted to play in the American Basketball Association (ABA) with the Minnesota Muskies. He won the ABA Most Valuable Player Award twice and was selected to five All-ABA Teams and seven ABA All-Star Games. He later played one season in the NBA with the New York Nets after the ABA–NBA merger. After his playing career, he became a coach for the Indiana Pacers and served two games as their interim head coach in 1988.

Pat Riley, the 7th pick, and Phil Jackson, the 17th pick, became successful NBA head coaches after ending their playing career. Riley won five NBA championships as head coach; four with the Los Angeles Lakers in the 1980s and one with the Miami Heat in 2006. He also won the Coach of the Year Award for a record three times, tied with Don Nelson. Jackson won eleven NBA championships, the most in NBA history. He led the Chicago Bulls to win three straight championships twice over separate three year periods; during 1991–1993 and 1996–1998. He then captured his third "three-peat" with the Lakers during 2000–2002, before winning two more title in 2009 and 2010. He also won a Coach of the Year Award in 1996 with the Bulls. Both coaches have been inducted to the Basketball Hall of Fame as a coach. They were also named among the Top 10 Coaches in NBA History announced at the league's 50th anniversary in 1996.

First pick Jimmy Walker was also drafted in the 1967 National Football League (NFL) Draft, despite never having played college football. He was drafted last in the 17-round draft by the New Orleans Saints. He stayed with his basketball career and became a two-time All-Star. On the other hand, the first pick in the 1967 NFL Draft, Bubba Smith, was drafted by an NBA team. He was selected with the 114th pick in the 11th round by the Baltimore Bullets. However, he stayed with his football career and played nine seasons in the NFL as a defensive end.

Future St. Louis Cardinals pitcher Bob Chlupsa was drafted by the Rockets in the thirteenth round out of Manhattan College.

Key

Draft

Other picks
The following list includes other draft picks who have appeared in at least one NBA game.

Notable undrafted players
These players were not selected in the 1967 draft but played at least one game in the NBA.

Trades
 On February 17, 1967, the Detroit Pistons acquired a first-round pick from the Los Angeles Lakers as compensation when Rudy LaRusso refused to report to the Lakers after being traded to the Pistons in a three-team trade on January 16, 1967. The Lakers used the pick to draft Sonny Dove.

See also
 List of first overall NBA draft picks

References
General

Specific

External links
NBA.com
NBA.com: NBA Draft History

Draft
National Basketball Association draft
NBA draft
NBA draft
Basketball in New York City
Sporting events in New York City